The 2023 Cork Intermediate A Hurling Championship is scheduled to be the fourth staging of the Cork Intermediate A Hurling Championship and the 114th staging overall of a championship for lower-ranking intermediate hurling teams in Cork. The draw for the group stage placings took place on 11 December 2022. The championship is scheduled to run from July to October 2023.

Team changes

To Championship

Promoted from the Cork Premier Junior Hurling Championship
 Ballygiblin

Relegated from the Cork Premier Intermediate Hurling Championship
 Youghal

From Championship

Promoted to the Cork Premier Intermediate Hurling Championship
 Dungourney

Relegated to the Cork Premier Junior Hurling Championship
 Meelin

Group A

Group A table

Group B

Group B table

Group C

Group C table

Knockout stage

Relegation playoff

Quarter-finals

Semi-finals

Final

References

External links
 Cork GAA website

Cork Intermediate Hurling Championship
Cork Intermediate Hurling Championship
Cork Intermediate Hurling Championship